Dheyab Al-Annabi (Arabic:ذياب العنابي) (born 20 June 1990) is a Qatari footballer who plays as a midfielder.

External links

References

Qatari footballers
1990 births
Living people
Al Sadd SC players
El Jaish SC players
Al-Khor SC players
Umm Salal SC players
Al-Shahania SC players
Qatar Stars League players
Qatari Second Division players
Association football midfielders